John Miller (July 8, 1909 – April 1983) was an American weightlifter. He competed in the men's light heavyweight event at the 1936 Summer Olympics.

References

External links
 

1909 births
1983 deaths
American male weightlifters
Olympic weightlifters of the United States
Weightlifters at the 1936 Summer Olympics
Sportspeople from Chester County, Pennsylvania
20th-century American people